The 17th Golden Bell Awards was held on 13 March 1982 at the Sun Yat-sen Memorial Hall in Taipei, Taiwan. The ceremony was broadcast by China Television (CTV).

Winners

References

1982
1982 in Taiwan